The Secrets of Rabbi Simon ben Yohai is a Jewish apocalypse of the mid-eighth century about the revelations of the 2nd-century rabbi Shimon bar Yochai, also known as Rashbi. It presented a Judaic messianic interpretation of the Arab conquest of the early 7th century and appears to confirm the authenticity of similar interpretations found in the Doctrina Jacobi.

When he saw the kingdom of Ishmael that was coming, he began to say: ‘Was it not enough, what the wicked kingdom of Edom did to us, but we must have the kingdom of Ishmael too?’ At once Metatron the prince of the countenance answered and said: ‘Do not fear, son of man, for the Holy One, blessed be He, only brings the kingdom of Ishmael in order to save you from this wickedness. He raises up over them a prophet according to his will and will conquer the land for them and they will come and restore it in greatness, and there will be great terror between them and the sons of Esau.’ Rabbi Simon answered and said: ‘How do we know that they are our salvation?’ He answered: ‘Did not the Prophet Isaiah say thus: “And he saw a troop with a pair of horsemen, etc.”? Why did he put the troop of asses before the troop of camels, when he need only have said: “A troop of camels and a troop of asses”? But when he, the rider on the camel goes forth the kingdom would arise through the rider on an ass. Again: “a troop of asses”, since he rides on an ass, shows that they are the salvation of Israel, like the salvation of the rider on an ass.’

References

Further reading 

 Bernard Lewis "An Apocalyptic Vision of Islamic History"  London: British School of Oriental and African Studies, 1950.

External links 
The Secrets of Rabbi Simon ben Yohai

Jewish eschatology
Historiography of the early Muslim conquests